Pocatello Regional Airport  is a city-owned, public-use airport located seven nautical miles (13 km) northwest of the central business district of Pocatello, a city in Bannock County, Idaho, United States.

The airport is built on the site of the Pocatello Army Airfield, a World War II training base.  Many of the base facilities have been razed, although four large hangars remain. The airport is also the home to the National Weather Service Pocatello Office.

As per the Federal Aviation Administration, this airport had 25,756 passenger boardings (enplanements) in calendar year 2008, 21,039 in 2009, and 20,825 in 2010. The National Plan of Integrated Airport Systems for 2011–2015 categorized it as a primary commercial service airport.

The airport is home to the Kizuna Garden, built to commemorate the bond between Pocatello and its sister city Iwamizawa.

Facilities and aircraft
Pocatello Regional Airport covers an area of 3,374 acres (1,365 ha) at an elevation of 4,452 feet (1,357 m) above mean sea level. It has two runways with asphalt surfaces: 3/21 is 9,060 by 150 feet (2,761 x 46 m) and 17/35 is 7,150 by 100 feet (2,179 x 30 m).

For the 12-month period ending January 1, 2012, the airport had 36,764 aircraft operations, an average of 100 per day: 79% general aviation, 20% air taxi, 1% military, and <1% scheduled commercial. At that time there were 73 aircraft based at this airport: 70% single-engine, 22% multi-engine, 7% helicopter, and 1% jet.

History 

 In 1943, the Pocatello Army Airfield was built as a Second Air Force heavy bomber (B-17, B-24) training base. By 1949, the new airfield had become a surplus property and was obtained by the city of Pocatello to build a commercial airport.

 while the starting date is unknown, Western Air Lines served Pocatello for a number of years, but discontinued all service by 1980. According to the airline's August 1, 1968 system timetable, Western operated Lockheed L-188 Electra turboprops into Pocatello. In September of 1973, this service was replaced with the new and more efficient Boeing 737-200, which offered nonstop flights to Salt Lake City, Las Vegas and Los Angeles. After discontinuing mainline flights, the airline subsequently served the airport as Western Express which was operated as code share service by SkyWest with commuter turboprop aircraft.

 In the mid 1970s, Hughes Airwest served the airport with Douglas DC-9-10 and DC-9-30 jetliners, according to the February 1, 1976 edition of the North American Official Airline Guide.

 In the mid 1980s, Cascade Airways served Pocatello with British Aircraft Corporation BAC One-Eleven twin jets, according to the February 15, 1985 edition of the North American Official Airline Guide (OAG).  The OAG also lists Cascade flights operated with smaller Fairchild Metro commuter turboprops.

 Horizon Air served Pocatello until January 7, 2006, originally with service to Salt Lake City in 1983. The airline canceled that service in favor of flights to Boise starting in 1984 operated with de Havilland Canada DHC-8 Dash 8 turboprops.

 Big Sky Airlines served Pocatello from the day Horizon canceled service until March 30, 2007.

 In 2014, a World War II-era mortar was found on the airport grounds while doing routine maintenance work. The mortar was safely removed by law enforcement.

Airline and destination

Statistics

See also

 Idaho World War II Army Airfields
 List of airports in Idaho

References

External links

 
 Pocatello AvCenter, the fixed-base operator
 Aerial image as of June 1992 from USGS The National Map
 
 
 

Airports in Idaho
Pocatello, Idaho
Buildings and structures in Bannock County, Idaho
1943 establishments in Idaho
Airports established in 1943
Airfields of the United States Army Air Forces in Idaho